Harry Louis Nathan, 1st Baron Nathan,  (2 February 1889 – 23 October 1963) was a British Liberal politician who from 1934 onwards represented the Labour Party.  He served two London seats non-consecutively and while serving the second seat was elevated to the House of Lords (by the creation of his peerage); five years later he served in two positions consecutively as a government minister in the Attlee Ministry until 1948.

Early life
Nathan was born in London in 1889, son of Michael Henry Nathan, a fine art publisher and magistrate. Educated at St Paul's School, he became a solicitor and member of the firm of Herbert Oppenheimer, Nathan and Vandyk. He became honorary secretary of the Brady Working Lads' Club, the oldest and largest of the London Jewish Lads' Clubs (now JLGB).

Nathan served in World War I, leaving with the rank of Major. He acted as honorary solicitor to the Zionist Organization which promoted the re-establishment of Israel.

Politics
He stood as the Liberal candidate in 1924 for Whitechapel and St. George's without success. He was a member of the Liberal Industrial Inquiry which prepared Britain's Industrial Future, also known as the Liberal Yellow Book. He was first elected in 1929 as Member of Parliament (MP) for Bethnal Green North East and was re-elected in 1931. Along with many other Anglo-Jewish communal leaders, Nathan was a founding member of the Central British Fund for German Jewry renamed some years after his death. In 1934, he defected to the Labour Party.  Labour won the seat at the 1935 general election but Nathan was not their candidate; he opted instead to stand in Cardiff South. He lost by 1.8% of the votes cast, a small increase in the two-party swing his campaign saw – of 271 votes – would have seen him elected.

In 1937, Nathan returned to Parliament in a by-election in Wandsworth Central as the Labour candidate. He in turn stepped down in 1940 to make way for Ernest Bevin, and was created a hereditary peer as Baron Nathan, of Churt in the County of Surrey on 28 June 1940. He continued in active politics from the House of Lords, serving as Under-Secretary of State for War (1945–46 and Minister for Civil Aviation (4 October 1946 – 31 May 1948). He was made a Privy Counsellor in 1946.

Family
His wife Eleanor Nathan was Chairman of London County Council (1947–1948). He was succeeded to the barony by his son Roger (1922–2007). His daughter, Joyce, was married to Bernard Waley-Cohen, later the 633rd Lord Mayor of London, and the son of Robert Waley Cohen, an industrialist and fellow leading member of the Central British Fund for German Jewry.

Arms

References 

The Times obituary, 25 October 1963

External links 
 
 

1889 births
1963 deaths
English Jews
English solicitors
Fellows of the British Academy
Fellows of the Society of Antiquaries of London
Jewish British politicians
Labour Party (UK) MPs for English constituencies
Labour Party (UK) hereditary peers
Liberal Party (UK) MPs for English constituencies
Members of the Privy Council of the United Kingdom
Ministers in the Attlee governments, 1945–1951
People educated at St Paul's School, London
UK MPs 1929–1931
UK MPs 1931–1935
UK MPs 1935–1945
UK MPs who were granted peerages
War Office personnel in World War II
20th-century English lawyers
Barons created by George VI
Military personnel from London
British Army personnel of World War I
Royal Fusiliers officers